The 1947–48 season was Colchester United's sixth season in their history and their sixth in the Southern League. Alongside competing in the Southern League, the club also participated in the FA Cup and Southern League Cup. The season was most notable for Colchester's run in the FA Cup, where they defeated three Football League clubs as they progressed to the fifth round, before being beaten 5–0 by First Division side Blackpool. They finished in 4th position in the Southern League, and while they ended as runners-up in the Southern League Cup, the final wasn't held until April 1949 due to fixture congestion.

Season overview
Manager Ted Fenton's first-team squad had featured 28 part-time professionals during the 1946–47 season, but this number was reduced to 17 for the 1947–48 campaign, while signings such as Bob Allen and Harry Bearryman, and the emergence of Vic Keeble bolstered the ranks.

The 1947–48 season was most memorable for Colchester's magnificent run in the FA Cup. The competition began with a 3–2 win over league rivals Chelmsford City in the fourth qualifying round in front of a Layer Road crowd of 10,396. It was the second year in succession that the U's would reach the first round proper of the cup, having been defeated 5–0 by Reading at the same stage twelve months earlier. The result on this occasion would go in Colchester's favour, with 8,574 fans watching their 2–1 win against Banbury Spencer.

Third Division North side Wrexham visited Layer Road for the second round match, with the visitors falling to a 1–0 defeat courtesy of a Bob Curry goal in front of a 10,642 crowd. With the U's into the third round, it would be the club that inspired Colchester's own strip, Huddersfield Town of the First Division, that would taste defeat at the hands of the non–Leaguers. With the national press making Colchester's Cup progress headline news, Fenton welcomed the extra publicity. He watched Huddersfield play a number of times prior to the tie, declaring to the media that he had come up with a plan to beat them. The plan became known as "the F–plan". Both teams changed colours for the game, with visiting Huddersfield in red, and Colchester in blue. The First Division side struggled to adapt to the cramped surroundings of Layer Road, and when Bob Allen's free kick was parried away by the goalkeeper, U's captain Bob Curry scored from the rebound. This was the first time that a non–League side had beaten a First Division club, with a record crowd of 16,005 witnessing that game.

With the increased interest in Colchester's cup heroics, the crowd from the previous game could have trebled had Layer Road been able to accommodate the fans. The club welcomed Second Division Bradford Park Avenue to the ground on 24 January 1948, with a crowd of 17,048 in attendance. With their opponents wary of Colchester's reputation, Bradford would take the lead, only for Curry to net a brace before being pegged back to 2–2. Fred Cutting went on to score the winner to send the club into the fifth round.

Stanley Matthews' First Division Blackpool were drawn as hosts to Fenton's side. With the effects of the war still evident, fuel rationing meant that the 52 scheduled coaches for the journey to Bloomfield Road were cancelled just 36 hours ahead of the game, meaning that only 12 coaches could travel, and the remainder of the away fans would have to travel by train to the North West. This meant that they would arrive in Blackpool in the early hours the morning of the match, but this did not deter the supporters, with the West Lancashire Post reporting:

Despite the good natured support, the home team defeated the U's by 5–0 in front of a sell-out 29,500 Bloomfield Road crowd. However, the FA Cup success had an effect on Colchester's league form, with the club eventually finishing fourth, nine points adrift of champions Merthyr Tydfil. They also reached the final of the Southern League Cup, but ran out of time to play the final during the season owing to fixture congestion.

Following all of the attention garnered from the Cup run, Fenton was much sought after, and was offered the role of assistant manager at his old club West Ham United during the summer of 1948, a role which he could not refuse.

Players

Transfers

In

 Total spending:  ~ £10

Out

Match details

Friendlies

Southern League

League table

Matches

Southern League Cup

FA Cup

Squad statistics

Appearances and goals

|-
!colspan="14"|Players who appeared for Colchester who left during the season

|}

Goalscorers

Captains
Number of games played as team captain.

Clean sheets
Number of games goalkeepers kept a clean sheet.

Player debuts
Players making their first-team Colchester United debut in a fully competitive match.

See also
List of Colchester United F.C. seasons

References

General

Specific

1947-48
English football clubs 1947–48 season